The Battle of Mill Springs, also known as the Battle of Fishing Creek in Confederate terminology, and the Battle of Logan's Cross Roads in Union terminology, was fought in Wayne and Pulaski counties, near current Nancy, Kentucky, on January 19, 1862, as part of the American Civil War. The Union victory concluded an early Confederate offensive campaign in south central Kentucky.

In late 1861, Confederate Brig. Gen. Felix Zollicoffer guarded Cumberland Gap, the eastern end of a defensive line extending from Columbus, Kentucky. In November he advanced west into Kentucky to strengthen control in the area around Somerset and made Mill Springs his winter quarters, taking advantage of a strong defensive position. Union Brig. Gen. George H. Thomas, ordered to break up the army of Maj. Gen. George B. Crittenden (Zollicoffer's superior), sought to drive the Confederates across the Cumberland River. His force arrived at Logan's Crossroads on January 17, 1862, where he waited for Brig. Gen. Albin Schoepf's troops from Somerset to join him. The Confederate force under Crittenden attacked Thomas at Logan's Crossroads at dawn on January 19. Unbeknownst to the Confederates, some of Schoepf's troops had arrived as reinforcements. The Confederates achieved early success, but Union resistance rallied and Zollicoffer was killed. A second Confederate attack was repulsed. Union counterattacks on the Confederate right and left were successful, forcing them from the field in a retreat that ended in Murfreesboro, Tennessee.

Mill Springs was the first significant Union victory of the war, much celebrated in the popular press, but was soon eclipsed by Ulysses S. Grant's victories at Forts Henry and Donelson.

Background
In 1861 the critical border state of Kentucky had declared neutrality in the fight to maintain the Union. This neutrality was first violated on September 3, when Confederate Brig. Gen. Gideon J. Pillow, acting on orders from Maj. Gen. Leonidas Polk, occupied Columbus, and two days later, Union Brig. Gen. Ulysses S. Grant seized Paducah. Henceforth, neither adversary respected the proclaimed neutrality of the state and the Confederate advantage was lost; the buffer zone that Kentucky provided was no longer available to assist in the defense of Tennessee.

By early 1862, a single Confederate general, Albert Sidney Johnston, commanded all forces from Arkansas to the Cumberland Gap. His forces were spread thinly over a wide defensive line. His left flank was Polk in Columbus with 12,000 men. The center consisted of two forts under the command of Brig. Gen. Lloyd Tilghman, with 4,000. Forts Henry and Donelson were the sole positions to defend the important Tennessee and Cumberland rivers, respectively. His right flank was in Kentucky, with Brig. Gen. Simon Bolivar Buckner's 4,000 men in Bowling Green, and about 4,000 in the Military District of East Tennessee under Maj. Gen. George B. Crittenden, which had the responsibility for guarding the Cumberland Gap, the gateway for entering pro-Unionist East Tennessee.

Crittenden's 1st Brigade was commanded by Brig. Gen. Felix Zollicoffer, whose main responsibility was to guard the Cumberland Gap. Assuming that the gap was fortified satisfactorily, in November 1861 he advanced west into Kentucky to move closer to the Confederate forces in Bowling Green and to strengthen control in the area around Somerset. The southern bank of the Cumberland River at Mill Springs was a bluff and a strong defensive position, whereas the northern bank was low and flat. Zollicoffer chose to move most of his men to the north bank where they would be closer to nearby Union troops, incorrectly assuming that it was more defensible. Both Crittenden and Albert Sidney Johnston ordered Zollicoffer to relocate south of the river, but he could not comply because he had insufficient boats to cross the unfordable river quickly and was afraid his brigade would be caught by the enemy halfway across.

Union Brig. Gen. George H. Thomas received orders to drive the Confederates across the Cumberland River and break up Crittenden's army. Thomas left Lebanon and slowly marched through rain-soaked country, arriving at Logan's Crossroads on January 17, where he waited for Brig. Gen. Albin F. Schoepf's troops from Somerset to join him. Crittenden, who until early January had remained in his headquarters in Knoxville, arrived at Mill Springs and realized that his inexperienced subordinate was in a dangerous situation. He devised a plan to attack the Union force before it could concentrate against him.  One section of the Union Army, three brigades under Thomas, was located at Logan's Crossroads, while Schoepf's brigade was at Somerset, separated by rain-swollen Fishing Creek, which might be a sufficient barrier to prevent the forces from joining together quickly. Crittenden ordered Zollicoffer to attack the Union camp at Logan's Crossroads at dawn on January 19.

Opposing forces

Union

Confederate

Battle

The Confederate march through the night was hampered by rain and mud, and the troops arrived at Logan's Crossroads cold and miserable. Many of the men carried antique, Napoleonic-style flintlock muskets, which became almost useless in the wet weather. The slowness of the march had cost them the element of surprise. Nevertheless, they launched a spirited attack, led from the front by Zollicoffer, and achieved some initial success. The 15th Mississippi Infantry and the 20th Tennessee pushed back the (Union) 4th Kentucky Infantry, under Col. Speed S. Fry, as well as the 2nd Minnesota and 10th Indiana and some Union cavalry.

In the poor visibility of the dark woods, clouded with gunsmoke, confusion reigned. Zollicoffer, who was conspicuous in front of his men with a white raincoat, mistakenly approached the Union 4th Kentucky infantry, believing they were Confederates firing on their own men. Zollicoffer was shot and killed, allegedly by Col. Fry himself. The sudden death of their commander and heavy fire from Fry's regiment caused the center of the Confederate line to fall back momentarily in confusion. Crittenden rallied his men and ordered a general advance by Zollicoffer's brigade and the brigade of Brig. Gen. William H. Carroll.

At this point, Thomas arrived on the field and ordered the 9th Ohio to advance while the 2nd Minnesota maintained heavy fire from the front line. Col. Robert L. McCook, commanding Thomas's 3rd Brigade, wrote that the lines were so close that the "enemy and the Second Minnesota were poking their guns through the same fence." When the 9th Ohio turned the Confederate left flank, the battle was decided. The Confederate troops broke and ran back toward Mill Springs in a disorderly rout, and Crittenden, who was rumored to be drunk during the battle, was powerless to stop them. They frantically crossed to the south side of the Cumberland, abandoning twelve valuable artillery pieces, 150 wagons, more than 1,000 horses and mules, and all of their dead and wounded. The retreat continued all the way to Chestnut Mound, Tennessee, (near Carthage), about  due east of Nashville.

Aftermath
Casualties were relatively light. Union losses were 39 killed and 207 wounded, Confederate 125 killed and 404 wounded or missing. Crittenden's military career was also a casualty. Accused of drunkenness and treason, his army was disbanded and he was reassigned to be a corps commander under Buckner at Bowling Green. Within two months he was relieved of his command and arrested for a subsequent episode of drunkenness. In October 1862, after a court of inquiry ordered by General Braxton Bragg, Crittenden resigned as a general and served without rank on the staff of Brig. Gen. John S. Williams and other officers in western Virginia for the remainder of the war.

The Battle of Mill Springs, along with the Battle of Middle Creek on January 10, broke the main Confederate defensive line that was anchored in eastern Kentucky. Confederate fortunes in the state did not rise again until summer when Gen. Braxton Bragg and Maj. Gen. Kirby Smith launched their Kentucky Campaign, which culminated in the Battle of Perryville and Bragg's subsequent retreat. Mill Springs was the larger of the two Union Kentucky victories in January 1862. With these victories, the U.S. carried the war into Middle Tennessee in February.

Battlefield today

The Mill Springs battlefield is located in Pulaski County, not far from Nancy, Kentucky and also in Mill Springs in Wayne County across from the lake (Cumberland river at the time of the battle). The historic town of Mill Springs, after which the battle was named, is actually across Lake Cumberland. This section of the battlefield, in Wayne County Kentucky, still offers the only two remaining structures remaining from the actual battle. The Brown-Lanier House and the West Metcalfe house are still standing and have weekend guided tours available in the summer months. Both buildings are operated by the Mill Springs Battlefield Association. To access this portion of the battle area on the other side of the lake one must travel via Highway 90 south towards Monticello and onto Highway 1275.

Portions of the battlefield in Pulaski county are preserved as a county park (named Zollicoffer Park in honor of the slain general). The Mill Springs Battlefield Association has protected portions of the battlefield by the acquisition of development rights to what is still a largely rural landscape, or by outright purchase. Zollicoffer Park contains the Confederate Cemetery, which consists of a mass grave. There is a corresponding Mill Springs National Cemetery in Nancy, where the Union dead were interred.

The Zollie Tree was the tree attributed as the place Felix Zollicoffer fell; it no longer exists, the victim of a lightning strike, but the stump is marked. The Civil War Trust (a division of the American Battlefield Trust) and its partners have acquired and preserved 685 acres at Mill Springs.

On November 4, 2006, the Mill Springs Battlefield Visitors Center and Museum was officially dedicated. Several commemorative ceremonies are held at the battlefield each year, including candlelight tours, living history presentations, and occasional re-enactments.

On January 15, 2013, Kentucky Representative Hal Rogers introduced the bill H.R. 298, officially titled "To direct the Secretary of the Interior to conduct a special resource study to evaluate the significance of the Mill Springs Battlefield located in Pulaski and Wayne Counties, Kentucky, and the feasibility of its inclusion in the National Park System, and for other purposes." Rogers said that "the Battle of Mill Springs is a source of great pride and interest to the people I serve." Rogers argued that the Battlefield was a "jewel" and would be "an excellent addition to the National Park Service." The John D. Dingell, Jr. Conservation, Management, and Recreation Act, signed into law on March 12, 2019, established the site as Mill Springs Battlefield National Monument.

See also

 List of battles fought in Kentucky

Notes

References
 Brown, Kent Masterson. The Civil War in Kentucky: Battle for the Bluegrass State. Campbell, CA: Savas Publishing Company, 2000. .
 Eicher, David J. The Longest Night: A Military History of the Civil War. New York: Simon & Schuster, 2001. .
 Esposito, Vincent J. West Point Atlas of American Wars. New York: Frederick A. Praeger, 1959. . The collection of maps (without explanatory text) is available online at the West Point website.
 Hafendorfer, Kenneth A. Mill Springs: Campaign and Battle of Mill Springs, Kentucky. Louisville, KY: KH Press, 2001. .
 Hewitt, Lawrence L. "George Bibb Crittenden." In The Confederate General, vol. 2, edited by William C. Davis and Julie Hoffman. Harrisburg, PA: National Historical Society, 1991. .
 Johnston, Col. J. Stoddard, and Col. John C. Moore. Confederate Military History, Vol. 9, Kentucky and Missouri. Edited by Clement A. Evans. Secaucus, NJ: Blue & Grey Press, ca. 1962. . First published 1899 by Confederate Publishing Company.
 Kennedy, Frances H., ed. The Civil War Battlefield Guide. 2nd ed. Boston: Houghton Mifflin Co., 1998. .
 Smith, Derek. The Gallant Dead: Union & Confederate Generals Killed in the Civil War. Mechanicsburg, PA: Stackpole Books, 2005. .
 *Woodworth, Steven E. Jefferson Davis and His Generals: The Failure of Confederate Command in the West. Lawrence: University Press of Kansas, 1990. .
 National Park Service battle description
 CWSAC Report Update – Kentucky

External links
Mill Springs Battlefield Association
 Battle of Mill Springs: Battle maps, history articles, and preservation news (Civil War Trust)
The Battle of Mill Springs: The Civil War Divides a Border State, a National Park Service Teaching with Historic Places (TwHP) lesson plan
 Official Reports from the Battle of Mill Springs

Mill Springs
Mill Springs
Mill Springs
Pulaski County, Kentucky
Wayne County, Kentucky
1862 in Kentucky
1862 in the American Civil War
January 1862 events